Kim Sun-tae is recipient of the 2007 Ramon Magsaysay Award for inspiring ministry of hope and practical assistance to his fellow blind and visually impaired citizens in South Korea.

References

Year of birth missing (living people)
Living people
Ramon Magsaysay Award winners